Therry Aquino Soriano (born 26 July 1996) is a Dominican Republic male badminton player. In 2016, he was selected as the Dominican Republic national badminton team. In August 2016, he became the runner-up of the Carebaco International tournament in the men's doubles event partnered with Reimi Starling Cabrera Rosario. He and Cabrera, also the semi-finalist at the 2016 Santo Domingo Open tournament. Together with the Dominican Republic badminton team, he won the mixed team gold medal at the 2016 Caribbean Badminton Championships.

Achievements

BWF International Challenge/Series
Men's doubles

 BWF International Challenge tournament
 BWF International Series tournament
 BWF Future Series tournament

References

External links
 

1996 births
Living people
Dominican Republic male badminton players
20th-century Dominican Republic people
21st-century Dominican Republic people